Synaptochaeta is a genus of flies in the family Stratiomyidae.

Species
Synaptochaeta digitata Lindner, 1964

References

Stratiomyidae
Brachycera genera
Taxa named by Erwin Lindner
Diptera of South America